This is a list of Islands of Bangladesh.

The islands of Bangladesh are scattered along the Bay of Bengal and the river mouth of the Padma.
The word "Char" is used in many of the names and refers to floodplain sediment islands in the Ganges Delta. Many large rivers originated from the Himalayas carry a high level of sediment and it accumulates across the shoreline of Bay of Bengal, Bangladesh. This has led to significant changes in the morphology of the coastal area, including the development of the new Islands.

Western Bay of Bengal 

 Ashar Char
 Andar Char
 Char Hare
 Char Lakhsmi/Birshreshta Hamid Island
 Char Manika
 Nijhum Dwip
 Ramnabad Island
 Char Mantaz
 Rangabali
 Dublar Char
 Burir Char
 Pakhkhir Char
 Dimer Char
 Char Bagala

Northern Bay of Bengal 
 Bhola Island, the country's largest island
 Ballar Char
 Sandwip
 Urirchar
Swarna Dweep (Jahajer Chor/ Jahejjar chor)
 Hatiya
 Manpura Island
 Char Sakuchia
 Char Nizam
 Char Kukri Mukri
 Char Lakshmi
 Char Montaz
 Nijhum Dwip
 Dal Char
 Char Gazi
 Char Faizuddin

Eastern Bay of Bengal
 St. Martin's Island
 Chhera island
 Jaliadwip
 Kutubdia
 Maheshkhali Island
 Sonadia
Urir Char

Disappeared islands

Islands that were previously existent but have now disappeared.

 Bholar Dweep, a small islet situated between Teknaf and St. Martin's Island, disappeared in 1861.
 South Talpatti Island was disputed between India and Bangladesh. The Associated Press reported it submerged by March 2010.

See also

References

Islands
Bangladesh

Islands